Morvada is a village in Vav Taluka of Banaskantha district in Gujarat, India.

History
Morvada is said formerly to have belonged to Turks and to have been conquered from them by Vaghela Rajputs, who in (1535), were expelled by Visaldev, a descendant of Lunaji Vaghela of Tharad. 
There is a Jain Temple in village. The idols are said to around 2200 years old (samprati maharaja).
It was ruled the Vaghela house of Tharad, the
lineal descendants of Visaldev till independence of India.

Morvada entered into agreements with the British Government in 1820s. It was under Palanpur Agency of Bombay Presidency, which in 1925 became the Banas Kantha Agency. After Independence of India in 1947, Bombay Presidency was reorganized in Bombay State. When Gujarat state was formed in 1960 from Bombay State, it fell under Banaskantha district of Gujarat.
Morvada falls on Radhanpur - Suigam state highway.

References

Notes

Bibliography
 

 This article incorporates text from a publication now in the public domain: 

Villages in Banaskantha district